The women's 1500 metres at the 2021 World Athletics U20 Championships was held at the Kasarani Stadium on 22 August.

Records

Results
The final was held on 22 August at 15:50.

References

1500 metres women
1500 metres at the World Athletics U20 Championships
U20